The 1998 Big East Conference baseball tournament was held at Senator Thomas J. Dodd Memorial Stadium in Norwich, Connecticut. This was the fourteenth annual Big East Conference baseball tournament. The  won their first tournament championship and claimed the Big East Conference's automatic bid to the 1998 NCAA Division I baseball tournament. Rutgers joined the Big East prior to the 1996 season.

Format and seeding 
The Big East baseball tournament was a 6 team double elimination tournament in 1998. The top six regular season finishers were seeded one through six based on conference winning percentage only. The division used the previous two seasons were discontinued, with all 11 teams competing in a single division.

Bracket 

* - Indicates game required 17 innings.

Jack Kaiser Award 
Dave Marciniak was the winner of the 1998 Jack Kaiser Award. Marciniak was a shortstop for Rutgers.

Notes 

 The Rutgers-Seton Hall 17 inning game was the longest in tournament history

References 

Tournament
Big East Conference Baseball Tournament
Big East Conference baseball tournament
Big East Conference baseball tournament
College baseball tournaments in Connecticut
Norwich, Connecticut